Hell's Outpost is a 1954 American Western film directed by Joseph Kane and starring Rod Cameron, Joan Leslie, Chill Wills, John Russell.

Plot
Tully Gibbs arrives in a California mining town looking for Kevin Russel, whose late son Al he had known in Korea during the war. Tully brings letters dictated by Al, who had lost the use of his hands. Kevin is grateful, saying Al had mentioned his friend Tully in previous correspondence.

Wealthy local bully Ben Hodes (who Tully had seen driving wildly when drunk) takes a dislike to Tully, particularly his attentions to Sarah Moffit, a woman Ben wants to have for himself. Despite Tully laying a hit on him when drunk earlier, Ben challenges Tully to a fight; Tully says he will oblige,  provided Ben lends him $10,000 if he wins. Tully then knocks him cold.

Ben keeps his end of the bargain, but after Tully uses the money to begin a rival mining enterprise, Ben sabotages a bulldozer, organizes a roadblock and impedes Tully wherever he attempts to go. Sarah confides in Sam Horne, the newspaper publisher, that she doubts the authenticity of Tully's story about Al's letters.

An attempt by Ben to blow up Tully's mine with dynamite backfires, leaving Ben dead. Tully discovers that Kevin has known all along that he wrote the letters from Korea himself, pretending the sentiments were Al's. He is forgiven, by Sarah as well.

Cast      
 Rod Cameron as Tully Gibbs
 Joan Leslie as Sarah Moffit
 Chill Wills as Kevin Russel
 John Russell as Ben Hodes
 Jim Davis as Sam Horne
 Ben Cooper as Alec Bacchione
 Kristine Miller as Beth Hodes
 Taylor Holmes as Timothy Byers
 Barton MacLane as Sheriff Olson
 Ruth Lee as Mrs. Moffit
 Arthur Q. Bryan as Harry
 Oliver Blake as Hotel Clerk

References

External links
 

1954 films
American Western (genre) films
1954 Western (genre) films
Republic Pictures films
Films directed by Joseph Kane
1950s English-language films
American black-and-white films
1950s American films